Bucephalandra vespula is a species of flowering plant in the family Araceae, native to Kalimantan on Borneo. It is an obligate rheophyte, found on shady granite rocks along fast-flowing streams.

References

Aroideae
Endemic flora of Borneo
Plants described in 2014